The Dzoraget is a river in the Lori region in Northern Armenia. It originates in the Bazum Mountains and flows west to east through spectacular gorges around Stepanavan. It finally feeds into the river Debed near Dzoragyugh, which ultimately drains to the Kura.

Dzoraget is a compound word in Armenian meaning Gorge-river and formed with the lexemes ձոր  ('gorge') and գետ   ('river') joined by the interfix ա  .

Rafting
The Armenian Travel Bureau considers the Dzoraget River the only Armenian river suitable for rafting. The commonest rafting route begins at the Dzoraget bridge, near the town of Stepanavan. Rafting on the river is concentrated in the Dzoraget Canyon, which is in some places as deep as 300 meters.

Towns and villages
Towns and villages along the river include: Stepanavan, Amrakits, Lori Berd, Agarak, Vardablur, Kurtan, Arevatsag, and Dzoragyukh.

Gallery

See also
List of lakes of Armenia
Geography of Armenia

References

Rivers of Armenia